Shade is the twelfth studio album by American musician Liz Harris under the stage name Grouper. It was released in the United States on October 22, 2021 on Kranky.

Recording 
Shade consists of songs recorded over a span of fifteen years, from 2006 to 2021.

Release 
Shade was announced on July 27, 2021. Accompanying the announcement, the track "Unclean Mind" was released. On September 15, Grouper released and shared a video for the track "Ode to the Blue". The video featured musician Julia Holter.

Critical reception 

The aggregate review site Metacritic assigns an average score of 86 out of 100 to the album based on 15 reviews, indicating "universal acclaim."

Shade was ranked the 2nd best album of the year in The Washington Post's year-end list.

Accolades

Track listing

References 

2021 albums
Grouper (musician) albums
Kranky albums